Herfiza Harun (née Novianti; born November 21, 1987) is an Indonesian actress and model. She is the wife of actor Ricky Harun and the daughter-in-law of the actress and model Donna Harun.

Career
Novianti began her career as a model, appearing in a 2003 magazine of Aneka Yess!. After the competition, Novianti had offered to casting in her debut soap opera, titled Dia, where aired on Indosiar from 2003 to 2005. During her soap opera career, Novianti has appeared in several soap opera, such as Cinta Fitri (Musim Ramadhan 2), Air Mata Cinta, Si Biang Kerok Cilik and Kiamat Sudah Dekat of season 2 and 3, which produced by Deddy Mizwar.

In addition, Novianti also appeared in several movies, such as Oh My God! (her debut film) and Kambing Jantan: The Movie, which produced by comedian and also writer Raditya Dika in 2009. In 2010, Novianti had starred for a controversial horror movie, titled Suster Keramas, with Rin Sakurigi, a Japanese adult porn.

Personal life
Herfiza Novianti was born on November 21, 1987, in Sukabumi. She is the third child of four siblings of Hendra Sumantri and Rina Faryani. She married the actor Ricky Harun on June 15, 2013. They have one daughter.

Filmography

Film

Television

Film Television

References

External links
 Profil di Kroscek

1987 births
Indonesian actresses
Indonesian female models
Sundanese people
People from Sukabumi
Living people